Chen I-hsin (born 30 October 1972) or Charles Chen is a Taiwanese politician.

Early life 
Chen I-hsin was born in Yunlin County on 30 October 1972. Chen completed a degree in politics at National Taiwan University and earned a master's degree from SOAS University of London.

Political career

Spokesperson of Kuomintang and Office of the President 
Chen served as the spokesperson for the Kuomintang, but left the position to return to SOAS and pursue doctoral studies in economics. By 2014, Chen had resumed his spokesperson duties, while also working for the Kuomintang's Culture and Communication Committee. In February 2015, he was named a spokesman for the Office of the President, serving until 2016, when Ma Ying-jeou concluded his second term as president.

Presiding the first national language interpretation session in Legislation Yuan  
Chen contested the 2020 legislative election as a party list candidate affiliated with the Kuomintang, and was seated to the Tenth Legislative Yuan.

As the Development of National Languages Act in 2018 stipulates the government offices to provide the interpretation services for the citizens participating in administrative, legislative, and judicial procedures to freely choose to use their national languages, the Legislative Yuan activated the synchronized interpreter service for the parliament session in real time accordingly. On 27 September 2021, after following the steps to apply in advance with 3 Taiwanese interpreters been present ready, Legislator Chen Po-wei of the Taiwan Statebuilding Party proceeded his scheduled questioning in Taiwanese during the session of Foreign and National Defense Committee. The Minister of National Defense Chiu Kuo-cheng was communicated but rejected speaking Taiwanese, nor accepted the interpreter's real-time service at site, but brought the deputy minister Zong-hsiao Li as his own interpreter, and insisted in the 3-way translation pattern sentence by sentence. Chiu repeatedly interrupted the question process by asking Chen to speak Mandarin Chinese for easier communication, or the session time cannot be lengthened to accommodate the interpretation, however Li is not a linguistic professional, hence his translation contains contextual errors, so Chen, being the chairman host in duty, had to intervene when the argument occurred, and introduced the existing synchronized interpretation in progress as the solution same as the common conference practice in the other countries; nonetheless Chiu never picked up the earset, yet insisted his way till the session run out of time.  Chen later apologized to the public for the good intention of practicing the national language law being turned into a linguistic communication tragedy, and condemned Chiu for "bullying", nevertheless Chiu denied the allegation and claimed that a language is a tool of communication.  The parliamentary interpretation service were temporarily suspended afterwards pending on better communication in the future - consequently Kuan, the other MPs and media editorials such as the Taipei Times commented that Language is not just a tool of communication as Chiu said, but also an identity of feelings and culture. Taipei City Councilor Miao Poya also explained that the multi-lingual working environment is essential for a healthy mind without the "Chinese Language Supremacy" attitude to achieve the international level in diversity, equality and mutual respect for a modern state.

He was considered a potential Kuomintang candidate for the Tainan mayoralty in the 2022 Taiwanese local elections, until March 2022, when the party chose to nominate .

References

1972 births
Living people
Alumni of SOAS University of London
National Taiwan University alumni
Political spokespersons
Politicians of the Republic of China on Taiwan from Tainan
Politicians of the Republic of China on Taiwan from Yunlin County
Members of the 10th Legislative Yuan
Kuomintang Members of the Legislative Yuan in Taiwan
Party List Members of the Legislative Yuan
Taiwanese expatriates in the United Kingdom